Blue Chip Economic Indicators is a monthly survey and associated publication by Wolters Kluwer collecting macroeconomic forecasts related to the economy of the United States. The survey polls America's top business economists, collecting their forecasts of U.S. economic growth, inflation, interest rates, and a host of other critical indicators of future business activity. It has a sister publication called Blue Chip Financial Forecasts, which surveys forecasts of the future direction and level of U.S. interest rates.

History

Blue Chip Economic Indicators and Blue Chip Financial Forecasts started in 1976.

Variables reported

The Blue Chip Economic Indicators survey provides forecasts for this year and next from each panel member, plus and average, or consensus, of their forecasts for each of these variables associated with the economy of the United States:

 Real GDP
 GDP price index
 Nominal GDP
 Consumer price index
 Industrial production
 Real disposable personal income
 Real personal consumption expenditures
 Real non-residential fixed investment
 Pre-tax corporate profits
 3-month Treasury bill rate
 10-year Treasury note yield
 Unemployment rate
 Total housing starts
 Auto and light truck sales
 Real Net exports

Reception

Academic reception
Many papers in the academic literature on the accuracy of macroeconomic forecasts have used the Blue Chip Economic Indicators for a data set of forecasts whose accuracy is to be evaluated. A paper by Laster, Bennett, and Geoum (1999) made a theoretical argument for how rational forecasters with identical information and incentives may still come up with divergent forecasts to maximize their probability of winning, and used the Blue chip Economic Indicators data to provide evidence supportive of their model. The paper noted: "The publisher of Blue Chip Economic Indicators, a monthly newsletter compiling dozens of professional economic forecasts, holds an annual dinner at which the most accurate forecaster for the previous year is honored. The winning forecaster is also identified in later issues of the newsletter."

The Congressional Budget Office has also cited Blue Chip Economic Indicators data in some of its publications.

Reception in the financial press and blogs
The results of the Blue Chip Economic Indicators have also been used to inform discussion in the financial press and blogs, including Forbes and Barron's.

In March 2009, PolitiFact reported that a controversial statement made by Christina Romer based on Blue Chip Economic Indicators data had correctly cited the Blue Chip Economic Indicators.

See also

 Economic forecasting
 Greenbook
 Western Blue Chip Economic Forecast
 Survey of Professional Forecasters
 ECB Survey of Professional Forecasters
 Consensus Economics: Surveys of International Economic Forecasts
 Livingston Survey

References

External links
 

Economy of the United States
Economic forecasting